Lieut-Col. George South MBE TD (1916 – 24 July 1988) was a British solicitor and philatelist who signed the Roll of Distinguished Philatelists in 1974.

He was Honorary Secretary of the Royal Philatelic Society London 1961–74, and President 1978–80. He was the mover behind the merger of the British Philatelic Association and the Philatelic Congress of Great Britain to form the British Philatelic Federation. He was awarded the Lichtenstein Medal 1986. He was Chairman of the London 1980 International Stamp Exhibition.

During World War II he served in the 21st Royal Tank Brigade and the 48th Royal Tank Regiment in North Africa. He fought at Monte Cassino. He was Chairman of the Dart Harbour Authority.

References

British philatelists
1916 births
1988 deaths
Signatories to the Roll of Distinguished Philatelists
Presidents of the Royal Philatelic Society London
Royal Tank Regiment officers
British solicitors
20th-century British lawyers